Loyola Institute of Technology and Science, Thovalai (LITES) is an engineering college which is situated in Thovalai, Tamil Nadu, India in the foothills of the Western Ghats.

External links

Jesuit universities and colleges in India
Engineering colleges in Tamil Nadu
Universities and colleges in Kanyakumari district